is a popular type of Japanese bento which consists of mostly rice along with fish, meat, pickles, eggs, vegetables, and an umeboshi (a salt pickled plum). There are also other kinds of food such as a chestnut-rice, sweetfish sushi, and meat-and-rice-casserole forms.

The word makuno-uchi bentō ("between-act bento"), dates back to the Edo period (1603 to 1867), when they were sold to theatre-goers during the intermissions of Noh and Kabuki theater performances.

From the Meiji period onward, makunouchi has become a common convention for bento boxes called ekiben sold at train stations. Convenience stores also sell a bento under the makunouchi name. Though the selection and number of items in a makunouchi bento vary from store to store, it often contains more items and costs more than other bento.

See also

Bento
Ekiben
Kyaraben

References

Japanese cuisine
Bento